Noel Evans may refer to:

 Noel Evans (footballer) (born 1930), Australian rules footballer
 Noel Evans (cricketer) (1911–1964), English cricketer